Iseropus is a genus of ichneumon wasps in the family Ichneumonidae. There are about nine described species in Iseropus.

Species
These nine species belong to the genus Iseropus:
 Iseropus barqueroi Gauld, 1991 c g
 Iseropus californiensis Cushman, 1940 c
 Iseropus coelebs (Walsh, 1873) c g b
 Iseropus gulensis Bustillo, 1975 c g
 Iseropus hylesiae Kasparyan, 2006 c g
 Iseropus orientalis Uchida, 1928 c g
 Iseropus pilosus (Cameron, 1903) c
 Iseropus serranoi Gauld, Ugalde & Hanson, 1998 c g
 Iseropus stercorator (Fabricius, 1793) c g b
Data sources: i = ITIS, c = Catalogue of Life, g = GBIF, b = Bugguide.net

References

Further reading

 
 

Pimplinae